Beatriz Haddad Maia and Zhang Shuai defeated Caroline Dolehide and Monica Niculescu in the final, 7–6(7–2), 6–3 to win the women's doubles tennis title at the 2022 Nottingham Open. Haddad Maia also won the singles event.

Lyudmyla Kichenok and Makoto Ninomiya were the defending champions, but neither returned to compete after Kichenok chose not to participate and Ninomiya competed in 's-Hertogenbosch instead.

Seeds

Draw

Draw

References

External links 
Main draw

Nottingham Open – Doubles
2022 Women's Doubles